Andre Begemann and Martin Emmrich were the defending champions but decided not to participate.
Russian pairing of Mikhail Elgin and Teymuraz Gabashvili won the title over Indians Purav Raja and Divij Sharan 6–4, 6–4.

Seeds

Draw

Draw

References
 Main Draw

Tashkent Challenger - Doubles
2013 Doubles